Jacques Pichon (born 31 December 1949) is a French sports shooter. He competed in the men's 50 metre rifle, prone event at the 1976 Summer Olympics.

References

1949 births
Living people
French male sport shooters
Olympic shooters of France
Shooters at the 1976 Summer Olympics
Place of birth missing (living people)
20th-century French people